Mohnish is a masculine name of Indian origin. The name generally means "Lord Krishna". People with name Mohnish are mainly Hindu by religion.

References

Lord Shiva once decided to impersonate Lord Krishna and participate in the dance with the Gopi's. He dressed up/impersonated Lord Krishna and danced with the Gopi's. Lord Krishna of course realized that and called him "Mohan+ish" i.e. being Mohan. So the name Mohnish although related to Lord Krishna, was actually given by Lord Krishna to Lord Shiva.

External links
 http://www.indiachildnames.com/name.aspx?name=Mohnish
 http://www.bachpan.com/Meaning-of-Mohnish.aspx
 http://www.indiaparenting.com/babynames/meaning-of-Mohnish.shtml

Krishna
Surnames of Indian origin
Given names
Masculine given names
Hindu given names